Francis Compton may refer to:

 Francis Compton (Conservative politician) (1824–1915), English lawyer and Conservative MP
 Sir Francis Compton (c. 1629–1716), English soldier and MP for Warwick
 Francis Compton (actor) (1885–1964), English actor

See also 
 Compton (surname)